Мelik (also transliterated as Meliq) ( melikʿ; from  malik (king)) was a hereditary Armenian noble title, in various Eastern Armenian principalities known as melikdoms encompassing modern Yerevan, Kars, Nakhichevan, Sevan, Lori, Artsakh, Northwestern Persia and Syunik starting from the Late Middle Ages until the end of the nineteenth century. After the invasions of the Seljuk Turks, Mongols, Timurlenk and Turkmen tribes these families saw themselves as holding onto the last bastion of Armenian independence in the region. 

The realm of the meliks was almost always semi-independent and often fully independent, they had their own court, known as a darbas, army, castles and military fortifications known as sghnakh, carried out justice in the form of trials and collected tax. 
The relationship between meliks and their subordinates was that of a military commanding general and junior officers, and not of feudal lord and a serfs. Peasants were not allowed to own land, but otherwise were free and owned property. Meliks preserved their rights and privileges after Eastern Armenia became part of the Russian Empire, many of them, especially meliks from Karabakh became Russian generals.

Melikdoms of Karabakh

The five Armenian Melikdoms of Karabakh: Gulistan, Jraberd, Varanda, Khachen, and Dizak, originated in the Principality of Khachen, an ancient feudal state that existed between the 10th and 18th centuries. These five principalities were ruled by the Beglarian, Israelian, Shahnazarian, Hasan-Jalalian, Avanian, Alaverdian, and Atabekian families respectively. In 1603 Shah Abbas I recognized their special semi-independent status. Rivalries among the meliks prevented them from becoming a formidable and a unified power against the Muslims but unstable conditions in Persia eventually forced them to forget their squabbles and seek support from Europe and Russia. 

In 1678 Catholicos Hakob Jughayetsi (Jacob of Jugha, 1655–1680) called for a secret meeting in Echmiadzin and invited several leading meliks and clergymen. He proposed to head a delegation to Europe. The Catholicos died shortly after and the plan was abandoned. One of the delegates, a young man named Israel Ori, the son of Melik Haikazyan of Zangezur continued on and proceeded to Venice and from there to France. Israel Ori died in 1711 without seeing the liberation of the Armenian lands. In the second half of the eighteenth century Melik Shahnazar of Varanda allied himself with Panah Khan Javanshir, the chieftain of a Turkic tribe, against other Armenian meliks which led to the downfall of the autonomous Armenian melikdoms of Karabakh.

Melikdoms (Principalities) of Eastern Armenia 

Altogether, there were between 70 and 90 melikly houses in Eastern Armenia, mostly in the provinces of Artsakh, Gardman, Syuniq, Lori, Yerevan, Nakhichevan, Kashatagh, and Karadagh. Below is the incomplete list of some of the most prominent Armenian melik houses:

(15th–19th centuries) 
 Melik Hasan-Jalalian (meliks of Khachen before 1755)
 Melik-Avanian (Meliks of Dizaq)
 Melik-Mirzakhanian (meliks of Khachen-Khndzristan after 1755)
 Melik-Shakhnazarian (meliks of Varanda)
 Melik-Beglarian (meliks of Gulistan)
 Melik-Haykayzan (meliks of Kashatagh)
 Melik-Israelian (meliks of Jraberd before 1783)
 Melik-Alaverdian (meliks of Jraberd in 1783 - 1814)
 Melik Atabekian (meliks of Jraberd since 1814 - mid-1850s)

 Meliks of Barsum (Utik)
 Meliks of Getashen (Utik)
 Meliks of Khachakap (Utik)
 Meliks of Voskanapat (Utik)
 11 melik houses (Syunik)

Prominent Meliks
Israel Ori (1658–1711)
David Bek (d. 1728)
Valerian Madatov (1782–1829)
Count Loris-Melikov (1825–1888)

Popular culture
The meliks of Karabakh inspired the historical novels The Five Melikdoms (1882) and David Bek (1882) by Raffi, the opera David Bek (1950) by Armen Tigranian and the novel Mkhitar Sparapet (1961) by Sero Khanzadyan. In 1944, David Bek the movie was filmed and in 1978, Armenfilm in association with Mosfilm produced another movie about the efforts of David Bek and Mkhitar Sparapet called Star of Hope. Former rap artist from Laindon, SS15 (United Kingdom)

Notes

Further reading
Hewsen, Robert. "The Meliks of Eastern Armenia," pts. 1-4, Revue des Études Arméniennes, Nouvelle Series, 9 (1972); 10 (1973-1974); 11 (1975-1976); 14 (1980).  
_. "The Tomb of Queen Mariam," Journal of the Society for Armenian Studies 20 (2011): pp. 169-71.

External links
 The Armenian Meliq Union
 The Honorable House of Melik 

Armenian noble titles
Early Modern history of Armenia